WD repeat-containing protein 5 is a protein that in humans is encoded by the WDR5 gene.

This gene encodes a member of the WD repeat protein family. WD repeats are minimally conserved regions of approximately 40 amino acids typically bracketed by gly-his and trp-asp (GH-WD), which may facilitate formation of heterotrimeric or multiprotein complexes. Members of this family are involved in a variety of cellular processes, including cell cycle progression, signal transduction, apoptosis, and gene regulation. This protein contains 7 WD repeats. Alternatively spliced transcript variants encoding the same protein have been identified.

Interactions
WDR5 has been shown to interact with Host cell factor C1 and MLL. It also interacts with the long non-coding RNA HOTTIP and to the lncRNA NeST.
WDR5 is a key determinant for MYC recruitment to chromatin

References

Further reading